Adrian Grigoruță (born 8 August 1983 in Romania) is a Romanian retired footballer.

Career

After failing to achieve promotion to the Romanian top flight with CSM Ceahlăul Piatra Neamț, Botoșani, Prefab 05 Modelu, SCM Râmnicu Vâlcea, and CSM Deva, Grigoruță signed for Moldovan outfit Milsami Orhei, where he earned a place in the 2010/11 team of the season in the left winger position.

For the second half of 2015/16, he joined Romanian second division side SR Brașov after playing in the Thai lower leagues, Israel, and Kazakhstan.

Following his stint with SR Brașov, Grigoruță played in the Swiss lower leagues.

References

External links
 Adrian Grigoruță at Soccerway

Romanian footballers
Living people
1983 births
Association football wingers
Association football midfielders
SR Brașov players
FC Milsami Orhei players
CSM Deva players
FC Okzhetpes players